The Sporting News Minor League Player of the Year Award was presented annually by The Sporting News to a player in Minor League Baseball deemed to have had the most outstanding season. It was awarded annually starting in 1936, and was last known to have been awarded in 2007.

Winners
The first winner of the award, Johnny Vander Meer, subsequently pitched in Major League Baseball (MLB) and is best known for pitching back-to-back no-hitters in 1938. Several winners of the award are inductees of the National Baseball Hall of Fame: Johnny Bench, Vladimir Guerrero, Derek Jeter, Pedro Martínez, Tim Raines, Jim Rice, and Phil Rizzuto. Two players won the award twice: Gene Conley (1951, 1953) and Sandy Alomar Jr. (1988, 1989). There was one tie, occurring in 1988 when Alomar Jr. shared the honor with Gary Sheffield. Each winner of the award went on to play in MLB, with the exception of Jason Stokes, who won the award in 2002 while in Class A and later reached the Triple-A level.

 1936: Johnny Vander Meer
 1937: Charlie Keller
 1938: Fred Hutchinson
 1939: Lou Novikoff
 1940: Phil Rizzuto
 1941: Johnny Lindell
 1942: Dick Barrett
 1943: Chet Covington
 1944: Ripper Collins
 1945: Gil Coan
 1946: Sibby Sisti
 1947: Hank Sauer
 1948: Gene Woodling
 1949: Orie Arntzen
 1950: Frank Saucier
 1951: Gene Conley
 1952: Moose Skowron
 1953: Gene Conley
 1954: Herb Score
 1955: Red Murff
 1956: Steve Bilko
 1957: Norm Siebern
 1958: Jim O'Toole
 1959: Frank Howard

 1960: Willie Davis
 1961: Howie Koplitz
 1962: Bob Bailey
 1963: Don Buford
 1964: Mel Stottlemyre
 1965: Joe Foy
 1966: Mike Epstein
 1967: Johnny Bench
 1968: Merv Rettenmund
 1969: Danny Walton
 1970: Don Baylor
 1971: Bobby Grich
 1972: Tom Paciorek
 1973: Steve Ontiveros
 1974: Jim Rice
 1975: Héctor Cruz
 1976: Pat Putnam
 1977: Ken Landreaux
 1978: Champ Summers
 1979: Mark Bomback
 1980: Tim Raines
 1981: Mike Marshall
 1982: Ron Kittle
 1983: Kevin McReynolds

 1984: Alan Knicely
 1985: Jose Canseco
 1986: Tim Pyznarski
 1987: Randy Milligan
 1988: Sandy Alomar Jr. & Gary Sheffield
 1989: Sandy Alomar Jr.
 1990: José Offerman
 1991: Pedro Martínez
 1992: Tim Salmon
 1993: Cliff Floyd
 1994: Derek Jeter
 1995: Karim García
 1996: Vladimir Guerrero
 1997: Ben Grieve
 1998: Gabe Kapler
 1999: Rick Ankiel
 2000: Jon Rauch
 2001: Josh Beckett
 2002: Jason Stokes
 2003: Zack Greinke
 2004: Dallas McPherson
 2005: Brandon Wood
 2006: Alex Gordon
 2007: Jay Bruce

Source:

See also
Baseball America Minor League Player of the Year Award
USA Today Minor League Player of the Year Award
Topps Minor League Player of the Year Award

Notes

References

Minor league baseball trophies and awards
 
Awards by newspapers
Awards established in 1936
Awards disestablished in 2007
1936 establishments in the United States
2007 disestablishments in the United States